The National Democratic Alliance (NDA) is a centre-right to right-wing conservative Indian political alliance led by the right-wing Bharatiya Janata Party (BJP). It was founded in 1998 and currently controls the government of India as well as the government of 15 Indian states and one Union territory.

Its first chairman was Prime Minister Atal Bihari Vajpayee. L. K. Advani, the former Deputy Prime Minister, took over as chairman in 2004 and served until 2014, and Amit Shah has been the chairman since 2014. The coalition ruled from 1998 to 2004. The alliance returned to power in the 2014 general elections with a combined vote share of 38.5%. Its leader Narendra Modi was sworn in as Prime Minister of India on 26 May 2014. In the 2019 general election, the alliance further increased its tally to 353 seats with combined vote share of 45.43%.

History 

The NDA was formed in May 1998 as a coalition to contest the general elections. The main aim of the NDA was to form an anti-Indian National Congress coalition. It was led by the BJP, and included several regional parties, including the Samata Party and the AIADMK, as well as Shiv Sena, but Shiv Sena broke away from the alliance in 2019 to join the Maha Vikas Aghadi with Congress and the NCP. Samata Party is also broke away from alliance in 2003 after formation of Janta Dal (United). The Shiv Sena was the only member which shared the Hindutva ideology of the BJP. After the election, it was able to muster a slim majority with outside support from the Telugu Desam Party, allowing Atal Bihari Vajpayee to return as prime minister.

The government collapsed within a year because the AIADMK withdrew its support. After the entry of a few more regional parties, the NDA proceeded to win the 1999 elections with a larger majority. Vajpayee became Prime Minister for a third time, and this time served a full five-year term.

The NDA called elections in early 2004, six months ahead of schedule. Its campaign was based around the slogan of "India Shining" which attempted to depict the NDA government as responsible for a rapid economic transformation of the country. However, the NDA suffered a defeat, winning only a 186 seats in the Lok Sabha, compared to the 222 of the United Progressive Alliance led by the Congress, with Manmohan Singh succeeding Vajpayee as prime minister. Commentators have argued that the NDA's defeat was due to a failure to reach out to the rural masses.

Structure 
The National Democratic Alliance does not have a formal governing structure such as an executive board or politburo. It has been up to the leaders of the individual parties to make decisions on issues such as sharing of seats in elections, allocation of ministries and the issues that are raised in Parliament. Given the varied ideologies among the parties, there have been many cases of disagreement and split voting among the allies.

Owing to ill health, George Fernandes, who was the NDA convener until 2008, was discharged of his responsibility and replaced by Sharad Yadav, the then national president of the JD(U) political party. On 16 June 2013, the JD(U) left the coalition and Sharad Yadav resigned from the role of the NDA convener. Then the Chief Minister of Andhra Pradesh N. Chandrababu Naidu was made the NDA convener. Later in 2018, after the withdrawal of TDP from NDA the post of convenor was vacant. However NDA allies like LJP demanded the appointment of a convenor in 2019 for better coordination of the allies.

On 27 July 2017 JD(U) with the help of BJP formed the government in Bihar. Later, on 19 August 2017 JD(U) formally rejoined the NDA after 4 years.

Strength in parliament 

Source:

Governments 

The BJP has previously been the sole party in power in Delhi, Chhattisgarh, Jharkhand and Rajasthan. It has also ruled Jammu and Kashmir, Punjab, Odisha, Andhra Pradesh as part of coalition and alliance governments.

The BJP has never been in power in 3 states - Kerala, Telangana, (between 1999 and 2004 BJP in alliance with TDP ruled a United Andhra Pradesh) and West Bengal. But BJP led NDA has ruled many local governing institutions including corporations, municipalities, panchayats and has also been elected to many Lok Sabha constituencies, state assembly constituencies and local body divisions and wards in these 3 states.

List of current NDA governments

Strength in legislative assemblies

Strength in state legislative assemblies

List of presidents and vice presidents
Note that it refers to nomination by alliance, as the offices of President and Vice President are apolitical.

Presidents

Vice presidents

List of prime ministers

List of deputy prime ministers

List of chief ministers

List of current deputy chief ministers

Candidates in elections

Lok Sabha general elections
 1998 Indian general election
 1999 Indian general election
 2004 Indian general election
 2009 Indian general election
 2014 Indian general election
 2019 Indian general election
 2024 Indian general election

Current members

Electoral history

Lok Sabha 1998 general election

Lok Sabha 1999 general election

Lok Sabha 2004 general election

Lok Sabha 2009 general election

Lok Sabha 2014 general election 

Contested by BJP symbol lotus
Indhiya Jananayaga Katchi
Kongunadu Makkal Desia Katchi
Puthiya Needhi Katchi

Lok Sabha 2019 general election 

Contested by AIADMK two leaves symbol
Puthiya Tamilagam
Puthiya Needhi Katchi

Past members

Timeline

2009 
Telangana Rashtra Samithi in United Andhra Pradesh, joined the NDA on 10 May 2009 and subsequently denied the fact that it joined NDA and clarified that they only extended the support.

2011 
Kuldeep Bishnoi led Haryana Janhit Congress (BL) Joined NDA.
Ramdas Athawale led Republican Party of India (A) Joined NDA.
Ajit Singh led Rashtriya Lok Dal withdrawn from the NDA.

2012 
Presidential election

NDA nominated P. A. Sangma as its presidential candidate who lost against UPA's Pranab Mukherjee.
Vice-Presidential election
Jaswant Singh was named as the candidate for the post of Vice-President against UPA's Hamid Ansari. Ansari won his second term in office.

2013 
On 16 June 2013, Nitish Kumar led Janta Dal United has withdrawn from NDA.
On 13 September 2013, Narendra Modi declared as PM candidate for 2014 Elections.

2014 
On 1 January 2014, Marumalarchi Dravida Munnetra Kazhhagam leader Vaiko has announced that MDMK formally joined back to NDA.
The two small parties viz Kongunadu Munnetra Kazhagam and Indhiya Jananayaga Katchi have also joined NDA.
The BJP would like two more southern parties such as Desiya Murpokku Dravida Kazhagam, Pattali Makkal Katchi to also join the alliance.
In Maharashtra, two regional political outfits, Swabhimani Paksha and Rashtriya Samaj Paksha, joined NDA in January. 
The coalition of five parties is termed as Mahayuti. So in Maharashtra now NDA alliance consist of 5 Parties viz BJP, Shiv Sena, Republican Party of India, Swabhimani Paksha and Rashtriya Samaj Paksha.
On 23 February 2014, Rashtriya Lok Samata Party led by Upendra Kushwaha joined NDA and will be contesting at 3 Lok Sabha seats in Bihar.
On 27 February 2014 Lok Janshakti Party led by Ram Vilas Paswan joined NDA It would contest at 7 Lok Sabha Seats in Bihar during 2014 Elections.
DMDK will be fighting Lok Sabha Election through an alliance with BJP led NDA.
Pattali Makkal Katchi led Social Democratic Alliance are the other allies of NDA in Tamil Nadu.
Maharashtra Navnirman Sena : Its President, Raj Thackeray announced external support to NDA on 9 March 2014 which is marked as Party's formation day, supporting Narendra Modi as Prime Ministerial Candidate.
Indian National Lok Dal : Its Gen. Sec., Sh. Ajay Singh Chautala announced external support to NDA, supporting Sh. Narendra Modi as Prime Ministerial Candidate.
Lok Satta Party : President Shri J P Narayan announced external support to NDA, supporting Sh. Narendra Modi as Prime Ministerial Candidate
All India NR Congress (AINRC) formally joined NDA on 13 March 2014 and will be contesting in Puducherry.
Telugu Desam Party (TDP) rejoined NDA on 6 April, after breaking alliance in 2004 post general election defeat.
Shiv Sena Though Shiv Sena has quit Mahayuti in Maharashtra, before Maharashtra Legislative Assembly Elections 2014, but has decided to remain with NDA at the Centre.
All Jharkhand Students Union clinched an alliance with BJP for Jharkhand Assembly elections under which its junior partner will contest eight of the 81 seats in the state.

2015 
Bharatiya Janata Party on 27 February 2015 clinched an alliance with People's Democratic Party for Government Formation in Jammu and Kashmir under which its CM will be from PDP.
In the month of November, BJP alliance lost the legislative assembly election in Bihar to the Mahagathbandhan comprising JD(U), RJD and the INC.

2016 
In January 2016, Bharatiya Janata Party clinched an alliance with Bodoland People's Front in Assam.
In March 2016, after a meeting with AGP President Atul Bora and former Chief Minister Prafulla Kumar Mahanta, BJP formed an alliance with Asom Gana Parishad for upcoming Assam legislative assembly election 2016.
BJP also aligned with Rabha and Tiwa Tribe outfit Rabha Jatiya Aikya Manch and Tiwa Jatiya Aikya Manch.
In March 2016, BJP forged an alliance with Kerala-based Ezhava outfit Bharath Dharma Jana Sena Party for Kerala Elections 2016.
Following BJP's victory in the Assam Legislative Assembly Elections 2016, the party formed an alliance of like-minded non-Congress parties in the Northeast, called the North-East Democratic Alliance, consisting of 11 regional parties of Northeast India. 
Himanta Biswa Sarma, BJP leader from Assam has been appointed Convener of the regional alliance.
On 21 December 2016, Khandu was suspended from the party by the party president and Takam Pario was named as the next likely Chief Minister of Arunachal Pradesh replacing Khandu after People's Party of Arunachal suspended Khandu along with 6 other MLAs.
In December 2016, Khandu proved majority on the floor with 33 of the People's Party of Arunachal’s 43 legislators joining the Bharatiya Janata Party as the BJP party increased its strength to 45 and it has the support of two independents. He became second Chief Minister of Arunachal Pradesh of Bharatiya Janata Party in Arunachal Pradesh after the 44 days lead Gegong Apang government in 2003.

2017
In January 2017, Bharatiya Janata Party's alliance partner Maharashtrawadi Gomantak Party in Goa and Shiv Sena in Maharashtra came together to contest Goa Legislative Assembly election in 2017 against the BJP with another Sangh Pariwar group called Goa Suraksha Manch.
The results of the 2017 Goa Assembly election gave rise to a hung assembly since no political party could achieve a complete majority of 21 in the 40 member Goa Legislative Assembly.
The Indian National Congress emerged the largest party with 17 seats but ultimately, the Bharatiya Janata Party which emerged victorious in 13 constituencies formed the government with the support of the Goa Forward Party, Maharashtrawadi Gomantak Party and independents.
The Goa Forward Party expressed its support to the Bharatiya Janata Party on the condition that the then Union Defence Minister of India Manohar Parrikar would return to Goa as the Chief Minister of Goa.
On 15 March 2017, N. Biren Singh was sworn as the Chief Minister by having coalition with NPP, NPF, LJP and others, the first time that BJP formed a government in Manipur, though the INC emerged as the single largest party.
On 27 July 2017, Janata Dal (United) rejoined NDA and formed a coalition government with Bharatiya Janata Party (BJP) in Bihar with Nitish Kumar as the Chief Minister and Sushil Kumar Modi as the Deputy Chief Minister, and with that BJP completed its domination in Hindi belt.

2018
On 9 March 2018, Biplab Kumar Deb was sworn as the Chief Minister having a pre-poll alliance with IPFT, the first time that BJP formed a government in Tripura.
TDP withdrew from the NDA on 16 March 2018 due to failure in fulfilling the promises made in the State Reorganisation Act and not granting the Andra Pradesh special status by the BJP.
Rashtriya Lok Samata Party (RLSP) withdrew from the NDA on 10 December 2018, citing a lack of progress on development in Bihar.
In December 2018's state elections, the NDA lost elections in Madhya Pradesh, Rajasthan, and Chhattisgarh to the INC. In Chhattisgarh, BJP was defeated by the INC with 3/4th majority. It was also defeated by the TRS in Telangana and BJP managed to win only 1 seat out of the 119 constituencies in Telangana

2019
On 7 January 2019, the AGP withdrew from the NDA and also from the Assam Government on the issue of citizenship amendment bill.
On 21 January 2019, the GJM withdrew from the NDA and extended the support to Mamata Banerjee .
On 19 February 2019, AIADMK and PMK rejoined NDA and BJP announced that "They will contest 5 Lok sabha seats in Tamil Nadu".
On 19 February 2019, Pattali Makkal Katchi rejoined NDA
BJP announced that "They will contest 5 Lok sabha seats in Tamil Nadu".
On 10 March 2019, DMDK rejoined NDA.
On 8 March 2019 in Sikkim, BJP joined hands with opposition party SKM
On 12 March 2019 in Assam, BJP joined hands with old ally AGP
On 12 March 2019 in Maharashtra, Rayat Kranti Sanghatana is a part of NDA
On 25 March 2019 in Tamil Nadu, Puthiya Needhi Katchi is a part of Alliance
On 4 April 2019 in Rajasthan, BJP joined hands with the RLP
On 5 April 2019 in Uttar Pradesh, Nishad Party joined hands with NDA
On 23 May 2019 NDA won the 2019 Indian General election with record breaking 352 seats with its allys 
In May 2019, NDA lost state elections of Andhra Pradesh & Odisha
In May 2019, NDA won the state elections of Arunachal Pradesh & Sikkim.
On 25 October 2019 in Haryana,

JJP joined hands with NDA to forming a stable government at Haryana with BJP
On 11 November 2019 in Maharashtra,

Shiv Sena exited from the NDA, as BJP was not willing to agree for Sharing CM Post with Shiv Sena to form government in Maharashtra.
In November 2019, NDA won the state election of Haryana 
In November 2019, NDA lost the state election of Maharashtra 
On 15 November 2019 in Jharkhand,
BJP, AJSU sever ties in Jharkhand days before Assembly elections 2019.

On 23 November 2019 in Maharashtra, NCP (Ajit Pawar Faction) joined NDA, Ajit Pawar took oath as Maharashtra's Deputy Chief Minister.
On 26 November 2019 in Maharashtra, Ajit Pawar resigns as Maharashtra's Deputy Chief Minister. With immediate effect Devendra Fadnvis also resigns from the post of CM of Maharashtra. His term becomes the shortest term as Maharashtra's Chief Minister.
In December 2019, NDA lost the state election of Jharkhand.

2020

On 16 January 2020 Jana Sena of Pawan Kalyan announced that tying up with Bharatiya Janata Party in Andhra Pradesh, this decision came after Chief minister Y. S. Jagan Mohan Reddy's intention to decentralise the capital, instead of developing Amaravati.
 Jharkhand Vikas Morcha (Prajatantrik) led by Babulal Marandi merged with the Bharatiya Janata Party on 17 February 2020, at Jagannathpur Maidan, Ranchi in presence of Union Home Minister Amit Shah, BJP president Jagat Prakash Nadda and former Chief Ministers of Jharkhand Arjun Munda and Raghubar Das.[excessive citations] Earlier, Marandi expelled MLAs Pradeep Yadav and Bandhu Tirkey from the party for "anti-party activities". Both of them later joined Indian National Congress in its Delhi headquarters.
 In February 2020, NDA lost the state election of Delhi
 In August 2020, Hindustani Awam Morcha re-joined NDA & granted 7 seats to contest in 2020 Bihar Legislative Assembly election.
 Shiromani Akali Dal announced leaving NDA in September 2020.
 In October 2020, the Vikassheel Insaan Party which had left the Mahagathbandhan (Bihar) joined the National Democratic Alliance and was granted 11 seats to contest.
 In October 2020, The All Jharkhand Students Union re-joined NDA.
 In October 2020, Gorkha Janmukti Morcha broke the alliance ahead of 2021 West Bengal Legislative Assembly election and allied with All India Trinamool Congress.
 In October 2020, Kerala Congress (Thomas) broke the alliance ahead of 2021 Kerala Legislative Assembly election and allied with United Democratic Front. 
 In November 2020, BJP had the alliance with Bodoland People's Front ahead of 2020 Bodoland Territorial Council election.[irrelevant citation]
 In November 2020, NDA won the state election of Bihar.
 In December 2020, United People's Party Liberal and Gana Suraksha Party joined the NDA and NEDA as alliance to Executive Committee in Bodoland Territorial Council.
 In December 2020, Rashtriya Loktantrik Party broken the alliance on the issue of 3 agriculture reforms laws.

2021 
 In March 2021, Kerala Congress (Thomas) Has Withdrawn alliance ahead of 2021 Kerala Legislative Assembly election And Joined United Democratic Front. 
 In March 2021, Desiya Murpokku Dravida Kazhagam broken the alliance for not issuing demanded number of constituency in the 2021 Tamil Nadu Legislative Assembly election.
 In April 2021, Goa Forward Party withdrew from the NDA for a variety of reasons, ranging from environmental issues to BJP apathy towards unemployment.
 In May 2021, NDA lost state elections of Tamil Nadu, Kerala, West Bengal
 In May 2021, NDA won state elections of Assam & Puducherry. 
 In May 2021, Sukhdev Singh Dhindsa led Shiromani Akali Dal (Sanyukt) joined NDA.
 In December 2021, Captain Amrinder Singh led Punjab Lok Congress joined NDA.

2022 
 In January 2022, Simarjit Singh Bains led Lok Insaaf Party joined NDA.
 In January 2022, Simarjit Singh Bains led Lok Insaaf Party broken the alliance for not issuing demanded number of constituency in the 2022 Punjab Legislative Assembly election.
 Bodoland People's Front rejoined NDA.
 NDA won the state elections of Uttar Pradesh, Goa, Uttarakhand & Manipur. 
 NDA lost the state elections of Punjab. 
 After Goa Assembly elections 2022 Maharashtrawadi Gomantak Party extended support to NDA.
 On 9 August 2022, Nitish Kumar led Janata Dal (United) has withdrawn from NDA.
 On 19 September, Capt. Amrinder Singh led Punjab Lok Congress merged with BJP
 NDA won state elections of Gujarat.

 NDA lost the state elections of Himachal Pradesh.

2023 
 In February, BJP broke alliance with National People's Party to contest all seats in 2023 Meghalaya Legislative Assembly election

See also 
 North-East Democratic Alliance
 Coalition government
 United Progressive Alliance
Mahagathbandhan
Federal Front

Notes

References

External links
lkadvani.in
narendramodi.in
amitshah.co.in

 
1998 establishments in India
Political parties established in 1998